Lucien Grosso (1 August 1932 – 15 January 1993) was a French bobsledder. He competed in the two-man and the four-man events at the 1956 Winter Olympics.

References

External links
 

1932 births
1993 deaths
French male bobsledders
Olympic bobsledders of France
Bobsledders at the 1956 Winter Olympics